William Healy may refer to:

 Will Healy (William Livingston Healy; born 1985), American football coach at the University of North Carolina at Charlotte
 William Healy (judge) (1881–1962), United States federal judge
 William J. Healy (1939–2001), member of the Ohio House of Representatives
 William J. Healy II (born 1960s), mayor of Canton, Ohio
 William Healy (actor) (born 2001), television actor
 William Healy (neurologist) (1869–1963), British-American psychiatrist and criminologist